The National Theater Award is a cultural prize that is awarded annually by the Spanish Ministry of Culture.

It was created in the 1950s and today is awarded annually by the National Institute of Performing Arts and Music. It recognizes and rewards the work of the entirety of an individual's professional life, or outstanding new contributions in the theatrical field.

Awardees

References 

Spanish awards
Spanish theatre awards